Companions in Nightmare is a 1968 crime-drama film. It had early roles for Louis Gossett Jr. and Bettye Ackerman, and it also starred Gig Young, Melvyn Douglas, Patrick O'Neal and Leslie Nielsen.

Plot
Dr. Lawrence Strelson (Melvyn Douglas) is a famous psychiatrist who conducts a group-therapy session with several high-priced professionals. It turns out that one of the patients is a murderer; the truth will come out, and it will be a shocker. Among the special guest suspects are Eric Nicholson (Gig Young), Carlotta Mauridge (Anne Baxter), Jeremy Siddack (Patrick O'Neal), Julie Klanton (Dana Wynter) and Dr. Neesden (Leslie Nielsen).

Cast
Gig Young as Eric Nicholson
Anne Baxter as Carlotta Mauridge
Patrick O'Neal as Jeremy Siddack
Dana Wynter as Julie Klanton
Leslie Nielsen as Dr. Neesden
Melvyn Douglas as Dr. Lawrence Strelson
William Redfield as Richard Lyle
Bettye Ackerman as Sara Nicholson
Louis Gossett Jr. as Lt. Adam McKay

External links
 
 

1968 films
1968 crime drama films
American crime drama films
American drama television films
1960s English-language films
1960s American films